Game day may refer to:

"Game Day" (Awake), a television episode
"Game Day" (Ozark), a television episode
"Game Day" (The Wire), a television episode
"Game Day", an episode of the TV series Pajanimals
Game Day, a 1999 film starring Richard Lewis
Game Day, a 2005 children's book by Ronde Barber and Tiki Barber
AFL Game Day, an Australian television program

See also
College GameDay (disambiguation), the name of various ESPN programs